The Baptist Evangelical Association of Madagascar is a Baptist Christian denomination in Madagascar.

History
Four Malagasy Baptist churches formed the association in 1997. In 2005 four churches were members of the association. Leadership is vested in a board of directors.

References

Christian organizations established in 1997
Baptist denominations in Africa
Baptist denominations established in the 20th century
Protestantism in Madagascar
1997 establishments in Madagascar
Religious organisations based in Madagascar